Leonardo Occhipinti (born August 11, 1960 in Milan) is an Italian former footballer who made more than 350 appearances in the Italian professional leagues, including 111 in Serie A.

Honours
 Serie A champion: 1979–80

References

1960 births
Living people
Italian footballers
Association football midfielders
Inter Milan players
Pisa S.C. players
Como 1907 players
ACF Fiorentina players
Cagliari Calcio players
Brescia Calcio players
Piacenza Calcio 1919 players
A.S.D. SolbiaSommese Calcio players
Serie A players
Serie B players